Franca Scagnetti (17 May 1924 – 1 November 1999) was an Italian film actress. She appeared in over 80 films between 1969 and 1999. She was born and died in Rome, Italy.

Selected filmography

 Ehi amigo, sei morto! (1970) - Nathaniel's Wife (uncredited)
 Trastevere (1971) - Andrea's wife
 I due assi del guantone (1971) - Mother of a Boxer (uncredited)
 In the Name of the Italian People (1971) - Porter
 Siamo tutti in libertà provvisoria (1971) - Woman Looking for Judge Stammati (uncredited)
 Senza famiglia, nullatenenti cercano affetto (1972) - Woman in Hospital (uncredited)
 Il sindacalista (1972) - Worker (uncredited)
 Le notti peccaminose di Pietro l'Aretino (1972) - Villager (uncredited)
 Crime Boss (1972) - Don Faiena's Maid (uncredited)
 Girolimoni, il mostro di Roma (1972) - (uncredited)
 Alfredo, Alfredo (1972) - Maid (uncredited)
 The Scientific Cardplayer (1972) - Pasqualina
 Meo Patacca (1972) - Paesana (uncredited)
 I pugni di Rocco (1972) - Concetta - Maid in Pataneos house
 Bella, ricca, lieve difetto fisico, cerca anima gemella (1973) - Nun
 Dirty Weekend (1973) - Restaurant Customer (uncredited)
 The Black Hand (1973) - Woman finding Body (uncredited)
 Even Angels Eat Beans (1973) - Woman in the Burning Room (uncredited)
 Giovannona Long-Thigh (1973) - Cameriera
 Hospitals: The White Mafia (1973) - Mother of a patient (uncredited)
 Ultimo tango a Zagarol (1973) - Partecipante alla gara di tango
 Once Upon a Time in the Wild, Wild West (1973) - Ma (uncredited)
 Polvere di stelle (1973)
 How Funny Can Sex Be? (1973) - Grazia's Mother / ('Viaggio di nozze')
 Abbasso tutti, viva noi (1974) - Rosa
 Il sorriso del grande tentatore (1974) - Supermarket Customer (uncredited)
 Giuda uccide il venerdì (1974) - Portinaia (uncredited)
 Fischia il sesso (1974) - Gavino's relative
 The Sinful Nuns of Saint Valentine (1974) - Nun (uncredited)
 Claretta and Ben (1974) - Innkeeper
 The Gamecock (1974) - The Peasant-Woman (uncredited)
 A pugni nudi (1974) - Prostitute (uncredited)
 Piedino il questurino (1974) - Donna in lutto con vassoio
 Amore mio non farmi male (1974) - Porter in Trastevere (uncredited)
 The Beast (1974) - Receptionist
 Scent of a Woman (1974) - Nun-nurse (uncredited)
 The Balloon Vendor (1974) - Theatre Attendant (uncredited)
 Bello come un arcangelo (1974) - Nun
 La badessa di Castro (1974) - The Backstreet Abortionist (uncredited)
 Seven Devils on Horseback (1975) - Villager
 Mark of Zorro (1975) - Cook (uncredited)
 Convoy Buddies (1975) - Farmer (uncredited)
 Down the Ancient Staircase (1975) - (uncredited)
 The Suspicious Death of a Minor (1975) - Giannino's Mother (uncredited)
 Violent City (1975) - Woman on bus
 Due cuori, una cappella (1975) - Sua madre
 Son tornate a fiorire le rose (1975) - Woman in Isola Tiberina (uncredited)
 Go Gorilla Go (1975) - Woman (uncredited)
 Eye of the Cat (1975) - Slaughterhouse Worker (uncredited)
 Confessions of a Lady Cop (1976) - Borgatara (uncredited)
 L'adolescente (1976) - Carmeluzza
 San Pasquale Baylonne protettore delle donne (1976) - Mother of Indemoniata (uncredited)
 Il comune senso del pudore (1976) - Cameriera trattoria / Restaurant waitress
 La linea del fiume (1976) - Amalia - madre di Amadeo
 Crimebusters (1976) - Donna che pesta gli scippatori
 Roma, l'altra faccia della violenza (1976) - Woman in the angry crowd (uncredited)
 Bruciati da cocente passione (9176) - La chiromante (uncredited)
 Tutto suo padre (1976) - Friend of Adalgisa (uncredited)
 La prima notte di nozze (1976)
 Febbre da cavallo (1976) - Passeggera del treno (uncredited)
 Sorbole... che romagnola (1976) - Rosalia's mother
 San sha ben tan xiao fu xing (1976) - Woman Hitting Paul (uncredited)
 La dottoressa del distretto militare (1976) - Passante (uncredited)
 Donna... cosa si fa per te (1976) - Cook (uncredited)
 Cuginetta, amore mio! (1976) - Priest's Housekeeper
 Suspiria (1977) - Cook
 Taxi Girl (1977) - Donna araba (uncredited)
 Per amore di Poppea (1977) - (uncredited)
 Il mostro (1977) - Portinaia (uncredited)
 Beach House (1977) - La donna grassa
 Pane, burro e marmellata (1977) - Caterina Ciccetti - Servant
 Mala, amore e morte (1977) - La donna delle pulizie-The cleaning lady
 Return of the 38 Gang (1977) - Woman (uncredited)
 Being Twenty (1978) - Pedlar (uncredited)
 Tanto va la gatta al lardo... (1978) - Mother of Maria (uncredited)
 Porca società (1978) - La madre
 Lobster for Breakfast (1979) - Trocchia Neighbour
 Neapolitan Mystery (1979) - Asylum patient (uncredited)
 Gardenia (1979) - Woman at Airport (uncredited)
 Scusi lei è normale? (1979) - Porter (uncredited)
 Tutti a squola (1979) - Donna con le borse della spesa (uncredited)
 L'imbranato (1979) - La portinaia
 Il corpo della ragassa (1979) - Maid in Brothel (uncredited)
 Arrivano i gatti (1980)
 Café Express (1980) - Donna nella toilette
 Sugar, Honey and Pepper (1980) - Mamma di Rosalia
 Una vacanza bestiale (1981) - Hostess
 Una vacanza del cactus (1981)
 Pierino contro tutti (1981) - Cassiera del Bar (uncredited)
 I figli... so' pezzi 'e core (1981) - Teresa (uncredited)
 Pierino medico della SAUB (1981) - Paziente imbrattata d'inchiostro (uncredited)
  (1981) - Madre del portiere (uncredited)
 Pierino il fichissimo (1981) - Assunta, la bidella (uncredited)
 Pierino la peste alla riscossa (1982) - Inquilina
 Eccezzziunale... veramente (1982) - Moglie del Cav. La Monica
 Sesso e volentieri (1982) - Linda Neighbour (uncredited)
 Monsenhor (1982) - Don Appolini's Maid (uncredited)
 All My Friends Part 2 (1982) - Cook (uncredited)
 Vai avanti tu che mi vien da ridere (1982) - Una cuoca al ricevimento (uncredited)
 Time for Loving (1983) - Donna scandalizzata
 Vacanze di Natale (1983) - Nonna Marchetti
 Il tassinaro (1983) - Party Guest
 Sfrattato cerca casa equo canone (1983) - Donna che vive sull'autobus (uncredited)
 Mamma Ebe (1985)
 Love at First Sight (1985) - Attilia
 Big Deal After 20 Years (1985) - Erminia
 Il Bi e il Ba (1986) - Woman with a Dog (uncredited)
 Storia d'amore (1986) - Assunta
 Missione eroica - I pompieri 2 (1987) - Ostessa
 Teresa (1987) - Woman from Sicily (uncredited)
 Casa mia, casa mia... (1988) - Homeless Woman (uncredited)
 The Secret (1990) - Maria
 Dark Illness (1990) - Vicina di casa (uncredited)
 Occhio alla perestrojka (1990) - Donna al mercato (uncredited)
 Faccione (1991)
 Schiaffi alla luna (1991)
 Ricky & Barabba (1992)
 Amami (1993) - Gianna
 Who Killed Pasolini? (1995) - Donna Idroscalo
 Giovani e belli (1996)
 Escoriandoli (1996)
 The Scent of the Night (1998) - Cameriera (uncredited)
 Una vita non violenta (1999)
 Regina Coeli (2000) - Gattara

References

External links

1924 births
1999 deaths
Italian film actresses
Actresses from Rome
20th-century Italian actresses